Hartbeespoort, informally known as "Harties", is a small resort town in the North West Province of South Africa, situated on slopes of the Magaliesberg mountain and the banks of the Hartbeespoort Dam. The name of the town means "gateway of the hartbees" (a species of antelope) in Afrikaans. Schoemansville, named after General Hendrik Schoeman, a Boer General in the Anglo-Boer War, who owned the farm that the Hartbeespoort Dam was built on, is the oldest neighbourhood of Hartbeespoort.

Hartbeespoort is the collective name of a few smaller towns situated around the Hartbeespoort Dam, including the towns of Meerhof, Ifafi, Melodie, Schoemansville and Kosmos.

The town consists of holiday homes and permanent residences around the dam as it is popular with visitors from nearby Gauteng Province. It is home to the Om Die Dam ultra marathon of 50 km, which takes place annually in the first half of the year.

Some of the main tourist attractions in or around the town are:
 The Hartbeespoort Dam wall and tunnel
 The Hartbeespoort Dam Snake Park
 The Hartbeespoort Dam Aquarium
 Hartbeespoort Aerial Cableway (the longest monocableway in Africa)
 Transvaal Yacht Club
 Oberon Leisure Resort
 Welwitchia Country Market
 The Elephant Sanctuary Hartbeespoort Dam
 Bushbabies Monkey Sanctuary
 Lion and Safari Park reserve
 Harties horse trail safaris
 Chameleon Village 
 
Van Gaalens Cheese Farm produces cheese. They give tours. Van Gaalens is famous for its mountain bike trails and has held the Nissan Mountain Bike series. More recently it has also hosted some stages of the Warrior Races.

Greenleaves is a wedding venue that has a coffee shop and a hairdresser. Greenleaves holds the annual HAWS (Hartbeespoort Animal Welfare Society) ball in November.

HAWS is situated on the Van Der Hoff road and welcomes visitors. Many schools have outings here and children are encouraged to pet the animals, clean cages and assist where possible. HAWS may provide letters of social community service should children require them. They have fund-raising events.

Other leisure-oriented venues around the dam include Pecanwood Golf Estate, Hartbeespoort Boat Club (near Kosmos), Sandy Lane Golf Club (at Caribbean Beach Club), Kosmos Marina Club, Magalies Park (estate and golf club). A number of other leisure developments and resorts are in progress.

In 2010 the Hartbeespoort Aerial Cableway was completely revamped and modernised and officially reopened on 14 August 2010 by Minister of Tourism Marthinus van Schalkwyk.

Hartbeespoort is part of the Madibeng Local Municipality, that also includes the nearby town of Brits.

Despite the semi-rural setting of the Hartbeespoort environs, it is ranked by the World Health Organization as the most polluted city in South Africa in terms of airborne particulates, with air pollution levels roughly twice that of Vereeniging, a heavily industrialised city south of Johannesburg.

See also 
 Hartbeespoort Dam
 Hartbeespoort Aerial Cableway
 The Elephant Sanctuary Hartbeespoort Dam
 Bushbabies Monkey Sanctuary
 Microcystin 
 Eutrophication

References

External links 

Populated places in the Madibeng Local Municipality